{{DISPLAYTITLE:C12H15NO}}
The molecular formula C12H15NO (molar mass: 189.25 g/mol, exact mass: 189.1154 u) may refer to:

 5-MAPB
 6-MAPB

Molecular formulas